Men's singles at the 1999 Pan American Games was won by Paul Goldstein of the United States.

Medalists

Seeds

  Cecil Mamiit (finalist)
  Paul Goldstein (champion)
  André Sá (third round)
  Maurice Ruah (third round)
  Bob Bryan (quarterfinalist)
  Paulo Taicher (semifinalist)
  Federico Dondo (quarterfinalist)
  Daniel Melo (quarterfinalist)
  Hermes Gamonal (third round)
  Yohny Romero (third round)
  Lázaro Navarro-Batles (third round)
  Marco Osorio (third round)
  Óscar Ortíz (quarterfinalist)
  David Nalbandian (semifinalist)
  Edgardo Massa (third round)
  Adrián García (third round)

Draw

Final rounds

Earlier rounds

Section 1

Section 2

Section 3

Section 4

References
Results

Men's singles